Perpignan is the prefecture of the Pyrénées-Orientales department in Southern France, in the heart of the plain of Roussillon, at the foot of the Pyrenees a few kilometres from the Mediterranean Sea and the scrublands of the Corbières massif. It is the centre of the Perpignan Méditerranée Métropole metropolitan area.

In 2016 Perpignan had a population of 121,875 (Perpignanais(e) in French, Perpinyanès(a) in Catalan) in the commune proper, and the metropolitan area had a total population of 268,577, making it the last major French city before the Spanish border. Perpignan is also sometimes seen as the "Entrance" of the Iberian Peninsula.

Perpignan was the capital of the former province and County of Roussillon (Rosselló in Catalan) and continental capital of the Kingdom of Majorca in the 13th and 14th centuries. It has preserved an extensive old centre with its bodegas in the historic centre, coloured houses in a series of picturesque streets and alleys stretching between the banks of the Têt and its tributary, the Basse.

The city is also known for its International Photojournalism Festival, its medieval Trobades and its centuries-old garnet industry.

Geography

Location
Perpignan is located in the center of the Roussillon plain, 13 km west of the Mediterranean coast. It is the southernmost of the cities of metropolitan France.

Hydrography
Perpignan is crossed by the largest river in Roussillon, the Têt, and by one of its tributaries, the Basse. Floods have occurred, as in 1892 when the rising of the Têt in Perpignan destroyed 39 houses, leaving more than 60 families homeless.

Climate
Perpignan has a typical Mediterranean climate (Köppen Csa) similar to much of the Mediterranean coastline of France. One might expect rain to be rare in the city, but in fact the annual precipitation levels are similar to the national average. However, the city is known for its patchy rains, with weeks or even months of rain falling in a matter of hours, followed by weeks and weeks without a drop of water. Perpignan experiences very hot summers and fairly mild winters. For decades, there has been no snow most of the time and temperatures can reach 40 °C (104 °F). Most of the precipitation occurs in the cold season, with extremely dry summers. A fresh north-westerly wind often blows, the Tramontana (French: Tramontane, pronounced [tʁamɔ̃tan]), keeping the sky clear much of the time, resulting in high annual sunshine. But the presence of this wind makes winters colder than they should be from the geographical position of the city.

Transport
Roads
The A9 motorway connects Perpignan with Barcelona and Montpellier.

Trains
Perpignan is served by the Gare de Perpignan railway station, which offers connections to Paris, Barcelona, Toulouse, and several regional destinations. Salvador Dalí proclaimed the station to be the "Cosmic Centre of the Universe" after experiencing a vision of cosmogonic ecstasy there in 1963.

Airport
The nearest airport is Perpignan–Rivesaltes Airport.

Toponymy
Attested forms
The name of Perpignan appears in 927 as Perpinianum, followed in 959 by Villa Perpiniano, Pirpinianum in the 11th century, Perpiniani in 1176. Perpenyà, which appears in the 13th century, is the most common form until the 15th century, and was still used in the 17th century. It probably derives from the Roman name Perpennius.

History

Though settlement in the area goes back to Roman times, the medieval town of Perpignan seems to have been founded around the beginning of the 10th century. Shortly afterwards, Perpignan became the capital of the counts of Roussillon. Historically, it was part of the region known as Septimania. In 1172 Count Girard II bequeathed his lands to the Counts of Barcelona. Perpignan acquired the institutions of a partly self-governing commune in 1197. French feudal rights over Roussillon were given up by Louis IX in the Treaty of Corbeil.

When James I the Conqueror, king of Aragon and count of Barcelona, founded the Kingdom of Majorca in 1276, Perpignan became the capital of the mainland territories of the new state. The succeeding decades are considered the golden age in the history of the city. It prospered as a centre of cloth manufacture, leather work, goldsmiths' work, and other luxury crafts. King Philippe III of France died there in 1285, as he was returning from his unsuccessful crusade against the Aragonese Crown.

In 1344 Peter IV of Aragon annexed the Kingdom of Majorca and Perpignan once more became part of the County of Barcelona. A few years later it lost approximately half of its population to the Black Death. It was attacked and occupied by Louis XI of France in 1463; a violent uprising against French rule in 1473 was harshly put down after a long siege, but in 1493 Charles VIII of France, wishing to conciliate Castile in order to free himself to invade Italy, restored it to Ferdinand II of Aragon.

Again besieged and captured by the French during the Thirty Years' War in September 1642, Perpignan was formally ceded by Spain 17 years later in the Treaty of the Pyrenees, and thereafter remained a French possession.

In June 2020, it was reported that the National Rally's Louis Aliot won the mayor election in Perpignan. it would be the first time that the Marine Le Pen's party has won a city of more than 100,000 people.

Government and politics

Mayors

International relations

Twin towns – sister cities
Perpignan is twinned with:

Partner towns

Education 
More than 10 000 students from 2 to 12 years old attend 61 preschools and primary schools in the city. Perpignan also has 26 highschools.

Population

Culture

Since 2004, the free three-day Guitares au Palais is held each year in the last weekend of August in the Palace of the Kings of Majorca. The festival has a broad mainstream focus with pop-related music as well as traditional acoustic guitar music and alternative music. The festival has attracted international guests like Caetano Veloso (2007), Rumberos Catalans, Pedro Soler, Bernardo Sandoval, Peter Finger, and Aaron and Bryce Dessner (2008).

Each September, Perpignan hosts the internationally renowned Visa pour l'Image festival of photojournalism. Free exhibitions are mounted in the Couvent des Minimes, Chapelle des Dominicaines and other buildings in the old town.

In 2008, Perpignan became Capital of Catalan Culture. In Perpignan many street name signs are in both French and Catalan.

Expression: Since 2011, "Where is the nailbox ?" is an interjection used to express our weariness about someone. This is an equivalent of "you gets on my nerves". Two students, Commenge and Vodkadéac, popularized this expression across the region.

Sport

Like the rest of the south of France, Perpignan is a rugby stronghold: their rugby union side, USAP Perpignan, is a regular competitor in the global elite Heineken Cup and seven times champion of the French Top 14 (most recently in 2009). They play at the Stade Aimé Giral.

A Perpignan-based rugby league club plays in British Super League under the name Catalans Dragons. The Dragons' games in Perpignan against the Northern English-based sides are usually very popular with British rugby fans, with thousands of them descending on the city on the day of the game, including many vacationing rugby fans travelling up from the Spanish Costa Brava joining the ones who came directly from home. The club was founded in 2000 as the merger of XIII Catalan with nearby neighbours AS Saint Estève to form Union Treiziste Catalane. The club is based at Stade Gilbert Brutus. The youth teams reformed as Saint-Estève XIII Mavericks, while a French top league semi-professional club was retained under the name Saint-Estève XIII Catalan; both play at the Stade Municipal in the in Saint-Estève suburb.

The local association football team is Canet Roussillon FC, there is also an Australian rules football club Perpignan Tigers and American football club Grizzlys Catalans.

The Roussillon Grand Prix was a Grand Prix motor racing event that was held between 1946 and 1949 in the streets of Perpignan.

Economy
Traditional commerce was in wine, olive oil, corks (the cork oak Quercus suber grows in Perpignan's mild climate), wool, leather, and iron. In May 1907 it was a seat of agitation by southern producers for government enforcement of wine quality following a collapse in prices. JOB rolling papers are currently manufactured in Perpignan.

Sites of interest
The Cathedral of St. John the Baptist was begun in 1324 and finished in 1509.

The 13th century Palace of the Kings of Majorca sits on the high citadel, surrounded by ramparts, reinforced for Louis XI and Charles V, which were updated in the 17th century by Louis XIV's military engineer Vauban.

The walls surrounding the town, which had been designed by Vauban, were razed in 1904 to accommodate urban development. The main city door, the Castillet is a small fortress built in the 14th century, which has been preserved. It had also been used as a prison until the end of the 19th century.

The Hôtel Pams is a lavishly-decorated mansion designed for Jules Pams that illustrates the artistic taste of the wealthy bourgeois at the turn of the 20th century.

Les Halles de Vauban are a new addition to the banks of the city's canal. Opened in November 2017 the indoor markets are privately owned and cost €1.5 million. Split into two locations, vendors offer fresh fruit and vegetables, bread, flowers, cheese, etc. There is a bar and central eating court with a range of tapas, burgers, omelettes and food from around the world.

Notable people linked to Perpignan
 Paul Alday (c.1763–1835), violinist, composer, and music publisher
 Anna Maria Antigó (1602–1676), abbess
 François Arago (1786–1853), physicist, astronomer, and liberal politician
 Alexandre Artus (1821–1911), composer and conductor
 Amédée Artus (1815–1892), composer and conductor
 Frédérick Bousquet (born 1981), freestyle and butterfly swimmer
 Robert Brasillach (1909–1945), fascist author and journalist
 Eugène Collache (1847–1883), French Navy officer who fought in Japan
 Mary Elmes (1908–2002), Irish aid worker
 François de Fossa (1775–1849), classical guitarist and composer
 Jean-Luc Escayol (born 1972), footballer
 Christian Andreu (born 1976), guitarist 
 Jacques-François Gallay (1795– 1864), French horn player and composer
 Philippe Georget (born 1962), novelist
 Louise Labé (1524–1566), Lyons poet of the Renaissance
 Aristide Maillol (1861–1944), sculptor and painter
 André Marty (1886–1956), communist leader
 Menachem Meiri (1249–c.1310), Catalan rabbi, Talmudist, and Maimonidean
 Isabelle Pasco (born 1966), actress
 Hyacinthe Rigaud (1659–1743), painter

Following a visit in 1963, the Catalan surrealist artist Salvador Dalí declared the city's railway station the centre of the Universe, saying that he always got his best ideas sitting in its waiting room. Dalí's painting La Gare de Perpignan commemorates his vision of "cosmogonic ecstasy" there on 19 September 1963. He followed that up some years later by declaring that the Iberian Peninsula rotated precisely at Perpignan station 132 million years ago – an event the artist invoked in his 1983 painting Topological Abduction of Europe – Homage to René Thom. Above the station is a monument in Dali's honour, and across the surface of one of the main platforms is painted, in big letters, «perpignan centre du monde» (French for "perpignan centre of the world").

Gallery

See also
Communes of the Pyrénées-Orientales department

References

Bibliography

Alícia Marcet, Histoire de Perpignan, la fidelíssima (1995), Perpinyà [Perpignan] : Llibres del Trabucaire,

External links

 
History of Perpignan 
Perpignan Tourist Office
Museum guide
Unofficial guide to Perpignan Airport 
Companie Transports – Public Bus System 

 
Communes of Pyrénées-Orientales
Cities in Occitania (administrative region)
Capitals of former nations
Northern Catalonia
Prefectures in France
Vauban fortifications in France
Cities in France